National Highway 15 (NH 15) is a National Highway in India. This highway starts from Baihata in Assam and terminates at Wakro in Arunachal Pradesh, while traversing through Mangaldai, Dhekiajuli, Tezpur, Banderdeva, North Lakhimpur, Kulajan, Dibrugarh, Tinsukia, Rupai and Mahadevpur.

References

National highways in India